Up the Street, 'Round the Corner, Down the Block is an album by guitarist Kenny Burrell recorded in 1974 and released on the Fantasy Records label.

Reception

Allmusic awarded the album 4½ stars.

Track listing 
All compositions by Kenny Burrell except as indicated
 "Up the Street, 'Round the Corner, Down the Block" (Onaje Allan Gumbs) - 7:18   
 "Afro Blue" (Mongo Santamaría) - 5:40   
 "Sausalito Nights" - 7:15   
 "Juice" (Gumbs) - 5:40   
 "A Little Walking Music" - 3:18   
 "Soulero" (Richard Evans) - 9:13 
Recorded at Village Recorders in Los Angeles, California in January 1974 (tracks 2 & 4) and at Fantasy Studios, Berkeley, California in February 1974 (tracks 1, 3, 5 & 6)

Personnel 
Kenny Burrell - guitar, whistling (track 5)
Jerome Richardson - flute, soprano saxophone, tenor saxophone 
Richard Wyands - piano, electric piano
Andy Simpkins - bass
Lenny McBrowne - drums
Mayuto Correa - percussion

References 

Kenny Burrell albums
1974 albums
Fantasy Records albums